Christoph Scherrer (born 1956 in Frankfurt am Main) is a German economist and political scientist. Currently, he is a professor of globalization and politics and Executive Director of the International Center for Development and Decent Work at the University of Kassel.

Life
Christoph Scherrer studied economics and American studies at the University of Frankfurt, where he also received his PhD in political science in 1989. From 1990-1998, he was an assistant professor at the J.F. Kennedy-Institute of the Free University Berlin. During this time, he was a guest professor at Rutgers University in Newark, a visiting fellow in  the Department of Political Science at Yale University, held  a J.F. Kennedy-Memorial Fellowship at Harvard University and was a Hewlett Scholar at the John E. Andrus Center for Public Affairs at Wesleyan University, Middletown, CT.
After obtaining his habilitation in 1999, he became a visiting professor of  European politics at the Berlin School of Economics and a visiting professor at the University of Kassel. Since 2000, he has been a full professor of  “Globalization & Politics” at the University of Kassel. Since then he has also held posts as  a visiting fellow at YCIAS-Yale University, visiting professor at the Universidad Autónoma de Yucatán, visiting scholar at the International Labour Organization, visiting professor at the Tata Institute of Social Sciences in Mumbai and senior fellow at the Center for Post-Growth Societies, University of Jena. 
Currently, Scherrer directs two English-language Master programs: MA Global Political Economy (GPE) and Labour Policies and Globalization (LPG). He is the Executive Director of the International Center for Development and Decent Work (ICDD), an awarded center of excellence in development cooperation, Co-Director of the Böckler/Böll funded PhD program “Global Social Policies and Governance” and a member of the Steering Committee of the Global Labour University. He is laureate of the "Excellence in Teaching" prize of the state of Hessen, 2007.

Research
Scherrer’s research interests lay in the field of international political economy, in particular the social dimensions of globalization. 
He contributed to the development of French Regulation Theory through an extensive study of the transition of the U.S. auto and steel industry to post-Fordism and through a post-structuralist inspired critique of its neglect of contingency in phases of stable capital accumulation. He introduced Gramscian insights to international political economy in Germany and coined the term ‘double hegemony’ for the interlaced linkage of the hegemony of the US-American national-state with the hegemony of an emerging international bourgeoisie. 
He directed numerous studies on the “Social Dimensions of International Trade” and “Trade in Services” funded by the Hans Böckler Stiftung (HBS), the Friedrich Ebert Foundation (FES), the German Foreign Office, the German Parliament, the European Parliament, and the Austrian Chancellery. His most recent work  is co-directing an international research project on economic inequality.

Books
 Scherrer, C. (2021) Macht in weltweiten Lieferketten, Hamburg, VSA. 
 Scherrer, C. (2021): America second? Die USA, China und der Weltmarkt, Berlin, Bertz + Fischer Verlag. 
 Karatepe and Scherrer (eds.) 2021: The Phantom of Upgrading in Agricultural Supply Chains: A Cross-Country, Cross-Crop Comparison of Smallholders, Nomos.
Scherrer, C. and Santosh, V.(2018). Decent Work Deficits in Southern Agriculture: Measurements, Drivers and Strategies. Augsburg: Rainer Hampp Verlag. 
Scherrer，C.(2017). Public Banks in the Age of Financialization: A Comparative Perspective. Cheltenham: Edward Elgar. 
Scherrer, C. (2017). Enforcement Instruments for Social Human Rights along Supply Chains. Augsburg: Rainer Hampp Verlag. 
 Christoph Scherrer, Katja Radon, Andreas Haarstrick, Lars Ribbe, Reiner Doluschitz(Hrsg.) 2016: Forced Migration - environmental and socioeconomic dimensions. Perspectives of higher education institutions in development cooperation: 19 - 20 Oktober 2016, Berlin, Germany: 1st Exceed Conference Summary. München: Exceed Conference.
 Ulrich Brand, Helen Schwenken, Joscha Wullweber (eds.): Globalisierung analysieren, kritisieren und verändern: Das Projekt Kritische Wissenschaft. Festschrift for Christoph Scherrer, VSA 2016, 
 with Alexander Gallas, Hansjörg Herr and Frank Hoffer (eds.): Combating Inequality. The Global North and South. Routledge, 2015,  (Look inside)
 Scherrer (ed.) 2014: T he Transatlantic Trade and Investment Partnership: Implications for Labor, Mering, Rainer Hampp Verlag. 
 with Bob Jessop, Brigitte Young (eds.), 2014: Financial Cultures and Crisis Dynamics, Oxford, Routledge. 
 with Debdulal Saha (eds.), 2013: Food Crisis: Implications for Labour, Mering, Rainer Hampp Verlag. 
 with Andreas Hänlein (Hrsg.), Sozialkapitel in Handelsabkommen - Begründungen und Vorschläge aus juristischer, ökonomischer und politischer Sicht, Integration Europas und Ordnung der Weltwirtschaft, Bd. 38. Nomos-Verlag, 2012
 Scherrer, C. (Ed.). (2011). China's Labor Question. München: Rainer Hampp Verlag. http://www.global-labour-university.org/fileadmin/books/CLQ_full_book.pdf
 with Caren Kunze, Globalisierung, Göttingen, UTB / Vandenhoeck & Ruprecht, 2011
 mit Thomas Dürmeier und Bernd Overwien (Hrsg.), Perspektiven auf die Finanzkrise, Leverkuse,. Verlag Barbara Budrich, 2010
 with Brigitte Young (Hrsg.), The Role of Gender Knowledge in Policy Networks, Baden-Baden, Nomos, 2010
 with Ute Clement, Jörg Nowak und Sabine Ruß (Hrsg.), Public Governance und schwache Interessen, Wiesbaden, VS Verlag, 2010
 Globalisierung wider Willen? Die Durchsetzung liberaler Außenwirtschaftspolitik in den USA, Berlin, Ed. Sigma, 1999
 Im Bann des Fordismus. Die Auto- und Stahlindustrie der USA im internationalen Konkurrenzkampf., Berlin, Ed. Sigma/Rainer Bohn Verlag, 1992

Recent articles
 Rajeev and Scherrer (2021): Smallholders’ Challenges: Realizing Peri-Urban Opportunities in Bangalore, in: Sustainability 2021, 13, 10160. 
 Scherrer (2021): The ‘Nested’ Power of TNCs: Smallholders’ Biggest Challenge, in: Agrarian South: Journal of Political Economy, 10(2), 1-13. 
Scherrer 2021: Biden’s economic confrontation strategy for China: implications for workers. in: Global Labour Column, Number 380.
Scherrer 2021: Capitalism First – wie immer, nur anders. Die US-amerikanische Außenwirtschaftspolitik unter Präsident Biden. in: PROKLA. Zeitschrift für kritische Sozialwissenschaft, 51(2), Heft 203, 297-315.
Scherrer and Ismail Doga Karatepe 2021: Kollektives Handeln als Voraussetzung für die wirtschaftliche und soziale Aufwertung. Theoretische Überlegungen und Beispiele aus landwirtschaftlichen Lieferketten, in: WSI-Mitteilungen 74 (1) 44-52
Scherrer, 2020: Superfluous Workers: Why SDG #8 Will Remain Elusive, in: Kaltenborn et al. (eds.), Sustainable Development Goals and Human Rights, Springer, 119-135.
Scherrer 2020: Novel Labour-related Clauses in a Trade Agreement: From NAFTA to USMCA, in: Global Labour Journal, 11(3) 291-306. 
Scherrer, C. and Abernathy, E. (2017). Trump’s Trade Policy Agenda, in: Intereconomics 52 (6), 364-369. https://archive.intereconomics.eu/year/2017/6/trumps-trade-policy-agenda/
Scherrer, C. (2017). The Development Rationale for International Labour Rights, in: The Indian Journal of Labour Economics (82) page 1 - 11. DOI: 10.1007/s41027-017-0082-3 https://link.springer.com/content/pdf/10.1007%2Fs41027-017-0082-3.pdf
 Scherrer (2017) Trump’s trade policy agenda: more liberalization, in: Global Labour Column, Number 278, June, http://column.global-labour-university.org/
 Scherrer, C., Shah, A. (2017) The Return of Commercial Prison Labour, in: Global Labour Column, Number 269, April, http://column.global-labour-university.org/
 Scherrer, C., Shah, A. (2017) The Political Economy of Prison Labor: From Penal Welfarism to the Penal State, in: Global Labour Journal, 8(1) 32-48. DOI: https://dx.doi.org/10.15173/glj.v8i1.2774
Book Review.(2015)"Odd Couple. International Trade and Labor Standards in History". Michael Huberman, in: International Review of Social History, 60(1), pp. 118–120. http://journals.cambridge.org/repo_A9607ebV.V5fLk
Herr, Hansjörg and Scherrer, Christoph.(2017)Trade, global value chains and working conditions, in: Friedrich-Ebert-Stiftung (ed.), Who benefits from trade? Findings on the link between trade and labour standards in the garment, footwear and electronics industries in Bangladesh, Cambodia, Pakistan, and Vietnam, Office for Regional Cooperation in Asia, Singapore. https://www.uni-kassel.de/fb05/fileadmin/datas/fb05/FG_Politikwissenschaften/GlobPolitik/Publikationen/FES_who-benefits-from-trade_Scherrer.pdf
with Michael Fichter, Mark Anner, and Frank Hoffer, 2014: The Global Labour University: A new laboratory of learning for international labor solidarity?, in: Working USA, 17(4) 567-579. Article first published online: 12 DEC 2014 | DOI: 10.1111/wusa.12139. http://onlinelibrary.wiley.com/doi/10.1111/wusa.2014.17.issue-4/issuetoc
 with Stefan Beck, 2014: Das transatlantische Handels- und Investitionsabkommen: Arbeitsplatzprognosen und Risikoanalysen, in: WSI-Mitteilungen 8/2014, 581–589. http://www.boeckler.de/wsi-mitteilungen_52133_52148.htm
Scherrer, C. (2014). Neoliberalism’s resilience: a matter of class. Critical Policy Studies, 8(3), 348-351. http://www.tandfonline.com/doi/abs/10.1080/19460171.2014.944366?journalCode=rcps20
 with Alexander Gallas, and Michelle Williams, 2014: Inequality – The Achilles Heel of Free Market Democracy, in: International Journal of Labour Research, 6(1), 143-161. 
 2013: Von der Finanzialisierung zurück zum Boring Banking? In: Vierteljahresheft zur Wirtschaftsforschung, 82(4): 31–43.
 Die Post-hegemoniale USA?, in: Zeitschrift für Außen- und Sicherheitspolitik, 6(1), 89-107.
 Reproducing Hegemony: US Finance Capital and the 2008 Crisis, in: Critical Policy Studies, 5(3) 219–247.
 with Joscha Wullweber, 2011: Post-Modern and Post-structural International Political Economy, in: Denemark, Robert A. (Hrsg.): The International Studies Encyclopedia, Blackwell Reference Online.
Scherrer, C. (2005). GATS: Long-term Strategy for the Commodification of Education. Review of International Political Economy, 484-510. https://www.jstor.org/stable/25124032?seq=1#page_scan_tab_contents
Scherrer, C. (2004). Global Governance: From Fordist Trilateralism to Neoliberal Constitutionalism. In New Rules for Global Markets (pp. 109–129). Palgrave Macmillan UK.
Chicago

External links
 Homepage at University of Kassel 
 Website of the ICDD
 CV on GLU website
 Twitter
 Facebook
 Official blog

References

Living people
German economists
German political scientists
1956 births